Küllük is a village in the District of Iğdır, Iğdır Province, in eastern Turkey. In 2019 it had a population of 964.

History 
The village is one of the 21 Muslim villages around Iğdır, which Armenian gangs raided and killed the men and raped the women in August 1919. On September 17th 1920, again a part of the village was murdered.

Geography
The village lies to the east of Tuzluca,  by road west of the district capital of Iğdır.

References

Villages in Iğdır Province

Iğdır Central District
Towns in Turkey
Populated places in Iğdır Province